Ministeria is a genus of Filasterea. The species can be found in the North Atlantic Ocean and in British waters.

References 

 Ministeria at WoRMS

Filasterea
Eukaryote genera